Bostrychopsebium usurpator is a species of longhorn beetle endemic to Sri Lanka.

Antennae shows small flabella in the last 7 antennal segments.

References 

Cerambycinae
Insects of Sri Lanka
Insects described in 1989